The Falls Fire Barn Museum, also known as the Fire Barn or Falls Fire Station No. 2 is a historic fire station on Commonwealth Avenue in the village of Attleboro Falls in North Attleborough, Massachusetts.  It was listed on the National Register of Historic Places as "Fire Barn" in 1982.

History
The Italianate two story structure was built in 1893 and added to the National Register of Historic Places in 1982.  It was an active fire station until 1976 and housed Engines 1 and 2, when it was replaced by a station built on Kelly Blvd (Rte 152). It has since been made into a museum for the local fire dept as well as the town history in general, and has many artifacts of local interest. The first curator was the late George Cunningham, who was active there until his late 90s.

Visiting information
It is supported by admission fees and by fundraisers sponsored by the local historical society.

See also
 National Register of Historic Places listings in Bristol County, Massachusetts

References

External links
 Falls Fire Barn Museum

Defunct fire stations in Massachusetts
Fire stations completed in 1893
Fire stations on the National Register of Historic Places in Massachusetts
Firefighting museums in Massachusetts
History museums in Massachusetts
History of Bristol County, Massachusetts
Museums in Bristol County, Massachusetts
National Register of Historic Places in Bristol County, Massachusetts